Henri Albert Hartmann (16 June 1860 – 1 January 1952) was a French surgeon. He wrote numerous papers on a wide variety of subjects, ranging from war injuries to shoulder dislocations to gastrointestinal cancer. Hartmann is best known for Hartmann's operation, a two-stage colectomy he devised for colon cancer and diverticulitis.

Hartmann Day 

Hartmann Day

16 June each year

Hartmann Day celebrates the invention by Henri Albert Charles Antoine Hartmann (born 16 June 1860) of the surgical operation that is now known as the Hartmann Procedure that has saved many lives; also the work of those who have performed the operation and of those who have supported patients about to have, having, or have had the operation.

Instituted in 2021 to mark one hundred years since publication of the operation.

See also
 Hartmann's critical point
 Hartmann's mosquito forceps
 Hartmann's operation
 Hartmann’s pouch

References

External links
 
 Who Named It?
 Spanish article about surgeon 

1860 births
1952 deaths
French surgeons